is a 1996 Japanese film directed by Kazuyuki Izutsu. It stars Takashi Okamura and Hiroyuki Yabe of the comedy duo Ninety-nine. It was followed by the sequel Young Thugs: Innocent Blood (1997) and the prequel Young Thugs: Nostalgia (1998).

Awards
39th Blue Ribbon Awards
 Won: Best Film

References

1996 films
Films directed by Kazuyuki Izutsu
1990s Japanese-language films
1990s Japanese films

ja:岸和田少年愚連隊